General Sir Guy Charles Williams,  (10 September 1881 – 2 February 1959) was a British Army officer who served as General Officer Commanding-in-Chief (GOC-in-C) Eastern Command during the Second World War.

Military career
Born in Bangalore in British India on 10 September 1881, Guy Williams was sent to England where he was educated at Sherborne School. He later attended the Royal Military Academy, Woolwich, where he was commissioned as a second lieutenant into the Royal Engineers and, after serving briefly in the Second Boer War, served in the First World War. His service in the war was outstanding, being mentioned in dispatches seven times and awarded the Distinguished Service Order in 1915 and, in 1918, commanding the 199th Brigade of the 66th Division, where he had previously been Commander Royal Engineers (CRE).

After attending the Staff College, Camberley, graduating in 1919, Williams was appointed Deputy Military Secretary at the War Office in 1923 and the commander of the 8th Brigade in 1927. In 1928 he became an instructor at the Imperial Defence College and then Engineer in Chief at Aldershot Command. In 1934 he was appointed commandant of the Staff College, Quetta, in India, and in 1937 he became General Officer Commanding (GOC) of the 5th Division. The division was then stationed in Palestine during the Arab revolt.

Williams served in the Second World War as GOC-in-Chief Eastern Command from 1938 to 1941, when he was appointed Military Adviser to the New Zealand Government: he retired later that year.

References

Bibliography

External links
Generals of World War II

 

|-

|-
 

|-

 

1881 births
1959 deaths
Graduates of the Royal College of Defence Studies
British Army generals of World War II
British Army personnel of the Second Boer War
British military personnel of the 1936–1939 Arab revolt in Palestine
Companions of the Distinguished Service Order
Companions of the Order of St Michael and St George
Graduates of the Royal Military Academy, Woolwich
Graduates of the Staff College, Camberley
Knights Commander of the Order of the Bath
People educated at Sherborne School
Military personnel from Bangalore
Royal Engineers officers
Commandants of the Staff College, Quetta
British Army generals of World War I
Military personnel of British India
British Army generals